The 1921 Nebraska Cornhuskers football team was an American football team that represented the University of Nebraska in the Missouri Valley Conference (MVC) during the 1921 college football season. In its first season under head coach Fred Dawson, the team compiled a 7–1 record (3–0 against conference opponents), won the MVC championship, and outscored opponents by a total of 283 to 17. The team played its home games at Nebraska Field in Lincoln, Nebraska.

Before the season
Former head coach Schulte stepped down to focus on coaching other sports at Nebraska, but remained involved with the team as the lineman coach.  New head coach Dawson arrived from Princeton, inheriting a team that had eighteen lettermen returning, the highest number ever for the program to date.  Nebraska also rejoined the Missouri Valley Intercollegiate Athletic Association after a two-year stint as an independent, so the high number of returning starters raised aspirations for a conference title.  A new league rule was enacted that restricted preseason practices to the two weeks prior to the first game, so much work was to be done after the summer break to be ready.

Schedule

Roster

Coaching staff

Game summaries

Nebraska Wesleyan

Nebraska Wesleyan arrived in Lincoln as Nebraska's tune up game, and nearly every player on the roster found time in the game as the Cornhuskers rolled to an easy shutout victory, as Nebraska's goal was never threatened.  This was the last game between these teams, ending the 5th-oldest active series in Nebraska's history to that date, all eight games Nebraska victories dating back to 1896.

Haskell

For the second game in a row, Nebraska brought to a close a historic series.  Nebraska's run of games with Haskell was the 7th oldest active series, dating to 1901.  Much like the previous game, Nebraska was never seriously threatened and posted another shutout win, bringing the Haskell series to a close with a 7–2 record.

Notre Dame

Nebraska's first ever trip to South Bend, after six straight games against Notre Dame in Lincoln, continued what had become one of the marquee games of the west.  The game was all about Nebraska's stingy defense and inept offense.  Time after time, the Cornhuskers turned away serious goal line threats, while also failing to find the scoreboard due to fumbles, incompletions and interceptions.  Knute Rockne changed his plan for the second half, to ensure Nebraska remained scoreless and banking on eventually finding points with low-risk plays, much like the previous year's game.  Chet A. Wynne was among the Notre Dame players who contributed to their one successful scoring drive, and with those points the game was decided.  Nebraska fell further behind in the series, to 2-4-1.

Oklahoma

The Cornhuskers bounced right back from the bitter loss in South Bend by blanking the reigning conference champion Oklahoma Sooners in Lincoln, in Nebraska's first conference game since returning to the league.  The win moved the Cornhuskers to 2-0-1 against Oklahoma to date.

Pittsburgh

Nebraska traveled to Pennsylvania for their first ever contest with Pittsburgh, known in the east as a strong team to be feared.  The Cornhuskers were undaunted, taking a halftime lead and ultimately holding the Panthers scoreless for the entire game.  Building on the exposure started by the 1920 victory over Rutgers the previous year, Nebraska solidified their reputation as a western powerhouse to the football fans of the east.

Kansas

The Cornhuskers easily handled the Jayhawks at the homecoming game, never seriously threatened during the course of the game as Nebraska recorded their fifth shutout over their previous six games, and improved over Kansas 18-9-1 all time.

Iowa State

Iowa State fired the first shot of the game, putting up an early field goal to take a 3–0 lead, but that was last time the Cyclones would speak.  The Cornhuskers ruined Iowa State's homecoming game by rolling up 35 unanswered points, finishing conference play unbeaten, and improving their dominating lead over Iowa State 13-4-1.

Colorado Ag

Nebraska finished the 1921 season with force, flattening the Colorado Ag football squad.  Though the Aggies managed a 4th quarter score, Nebraska's 70 points were the most they had scored against any opponent since their 100–0 victory over Nebraska Wesleyan in 1917.  Colorado Ag was now down 0–2 against Nebraska to date.

After the season
Coach Dawson's first season was a clear success, with all games won except for the hard-fought Notre Dame loss, and an undisputed league championship secured in Nebraska's return to league play.  The program's overall record improved to 181-61-15 (.733), while the conference record was improved to 27-3-2 (.875).

References

Nebraska
Nebraska Cornhuskers football seasons
Missouri Valley Conference football champion seasons
Nebraska Cornhuskers football